Max Görtz (born January 28, 1993) is a Swedish professional ice hockey forward. He is currently playing with KalPa in the Liiga. Görtz was selected by the Nashville Predators in the 6th round (172nd overall) of the 2012 NHL Entry Draft.

Playing career
Görtz originally played as a youth within the Malmö Redhawks organization at the J20 SuperElit level. He later made his professional debut appearing in the Swedish Hockey League with Färjestad BK and Frölunda HC. On June 2, 2014, he signed a three-year entry level contract with Nashville.

After a successful rookie season in North America scoring 47 points in 72 games with the Predators AHL affiliate, the Milwaukee Admirals , Görtz was unable to consolidate his performance in repeating his offensive contribution the following 2016–17 season. After 30 games, having registered just 1 goal and 4 points, Görtz was traded by the Predators to the Anaheim Ducks, in exchange for Andrew O'Brien on January 19, 2017.

Having failed to make his debut at the NHL level throughout the duration of his rookie contract, as an impending restricted free agent, Görtz opted to return to his original club in Sweden, the Malmö Redhawks of the SHL, in signing a two-year contract on May 26, 2017.

At the completion of his contract with the Redhawks, Görtz left Sweden to sign a one-year contract with German club, Grizzlys Wolfsburg of the Deutsche Eishockey Liga (DEL), on 7 August 2020.

Having completed a second season in the DEL with Schwenninger Wild Wings, Görtz left Germany and was signed as a free agent to a two-year contact with Finnish club, KalPa of the Liiga, on 11 June 2022.

Career statistics

Regular season and playoffs

International

References

External links

1993 births
Living people
Cincinnati Cyclones (ECHL) players
Färjestad BK players
Frölunda HC players
Grizzlys Wolfsburg players
Malmö Redhawks players
Milwaukee Admirals players
Nashville Predators draft picks
San Diego Gulls (AHL) players
Schwenninger Wild Wings players
Swedish ice hockey right wingers